The “Art, Science and Peace Prize” is awarded every three years. It is given to artists and scientists who have worked for peace and the welfare of society and the world. The Prize is accompanied by a sum of money that can vary in each edition.
The Prize is awarded by a jury appointed by the International Non-Profit Organization “Man Center” in collaboration with the “World Interreligious Center.”
Since its foundation, Pier Franco Marcenaro has been the Chairman of the Jury.

Prize winners and reasons
 Year 2002. Writer and essayist Fernanda Pivano. For translating and disseminating great USA pacifist writers who bring a message of peace and non-violence to the world.
 Year 2005. Director Franco Zeffirelli. For his directing of the movies “Jesus of Nazareth”, “Brother Sun and Sister Moon” and “Romeo and Juliet”, which have expressed a message of brotherhood and peace worldwide.
 Year 2008. Not awarded.
 Year 2012. Professor Umberto Veronesi. For his long career dedicated to alleviating suffering and spreading principles directed to respect for the human person in the world.
 Year 2015. Tenor Andrea Bocelli.For spreading with his voice a worldwide message of brotherhood and peace, beyond all barriers of race, nationality or religion.
 Year 2018. Actor Roberto Benigni. For his unequalled ability to reach the heart of the public by transmitting a message of high artistic, human and spiritual value aimed at reawakening one’s conscience and favoring understanding and love between people and populations.

Notes

Peace awards